Wojciech Żabiałowicz (born 16 October 1957) is a former international speedway rider from Poland.

Speedway career 
Żabiałowicz was the champion of Poland, winning the Polish Individual Speedway Championship in 1987.

References 

Living people
1957 births
Polish speedway riders